Try 'N' B may refer to:

Try 'N' B, an alternate name of band The Real Milli Vanilli
Try 'N' B, an album of Try 'N' B, released in US as an alternate release to The Real Milli Vanilli's album The Moment of Truth